Charles Marshall Kennedy (15 December 1849 – 31 January 1906) was an English cricketer.  Kennedy was a right-handed batsman who fielded as a wicket-keeper.  He was born at Woodmancote, Sussex.

Kennedy made his first-class debut for Sussex against Gloucestershire in 1872.  He made twenty further first-class appearances for the county, the last of which came against Surrey in 1878.  In his 21 first-class matches for Sussex, he scored a total of 272 runs at an average of 8.00, with a high score of 37.  He also made two first-class appearances for the South against the North in 1875.

He died at Tunbridge Wells, Kent, on 31 January 1906.

References

External links
Charles Kennedy at ESPNcricinfo
Charles Kennedy at CricketArchive

1849 births
1906 deaths
People from Westbourne, West Sussex
English cricketers
Sussex cricketers
North v South cricketers
People from Royal Tunbridge Wells
Wicket-keepers